The Akatarawa Valley is a valley in the Tararua Range of New Zealand's North Island. It provides a link from the upper reaches of the Hutt Valley to Waikanae on the Kapiti Coast through rugged hill country. The valley is lowly populated and contains the localities of Reikorangi and Cloustonville. At the Hutt Valley end, the Akatarawa Valley is rugged and the Akatarawa River flows through it. The terrain is less difficult at the Kapiti end, where the Waikanae River flows through part of the valley on its route from its headwaters in the Tararuas to the Tasman Sea, and is met in the valley by tributaries such as the Ngatiawa River and the Reikorangi Stream.

Many residents are craftspeople or gardeners, and some gardens are open for public viewing. Also located in the valley is a former Salvation Army youth and family camp that has been upgraded and now operated by the Wellesley Group, and Staglands Wildlife Reserve & Cafe, a conservation project established in 1972. It supports many native and rare birds, insects, and animals in conjunction with the New Zealand Department of Conservation.

An early proposal for the North Island Main Trunk Railway's route out of Wellington featured a line deviating from the Hutt Valley Line portion of the Wairarapa Line and running through the Akatarawa Valley to the west coast; see Haywards–Plimmerton Line.  This proposal was considered in the 1870s but abandoned when the Wellington and Manawatu Railway Company chose a route directly out of Wellington via Johnsonville and Porirua.  A railway through the Akatarawa Valley has not been seriously considered since this stage, though Price's Bush Tramway and other industrial tramways were built to serve private logging interests.  The tramways and mills they served are now closed and little evidence remains of their existence.

Demographics

Akatarawa had a population of 648 at the 2018 New Zealand census, an increase of 42 people (6.9%) since the 2013 census, and an increase of 93 people (16.8%) since the 2006 census. There were 237 households. There were 336 males and 312 females, giving a sex ratio of 1.08 males per female. The median age was 45.3 years (compared with 37.4 years nationally), with 99 people (15.3%) aged under 15 years, 111 (17.1%) aged 15 to 29, 360 (55.6%) aged 30 to 64, and 75 (11.6%) aged 65 or older.

Ethnicities were 94.0% European/Pākehā, 8.3% Māori, 0.5% Pacific peoples, 1.4% Asian, and 3.2% other ethnicities (totals add to more than 100% since people could identify with multiple ethnicities).

The proportion of people born overseas was 21.3%, compared with 27.1% nationally.

Although some people objected to giving their religion, 60.2% had no religion, 28.7% were Christian and 2.8% had other religions.

Of those at least 15 years old, 141 (25.7%) people had a bachelor or higher degree, and 66 (12.0%) people had no formal qualifications. The median income was $40,900, compared with $31,800 nationally. The employment status of those at least 15 was that 324 (59.0%) people were employed full-time, 96 (17.5%) were part-time, and 12 (2.2%) were unemployed.

See also 
 Akatarawa Saddle

References

External links
 Staglands Wildlife Reserve - official website
 https://web.archive.org/web/20070717003248/http://www.wellesleycountryclub.co.nz/
 http://www.facebook.com/Efil.Doog.2015/?ref=hl

Valleys of the Wellington Region
Upper Hutt
Waikanae
Populated places in the Wellington Region